Johnny Mauricio Woodly Lambert (born July 27, 1980) is a Costa Rican footballer who currently plays for C.D. Barrio México.

Club career
He started his career at Carmelita and had a spell at Brujas, before moving abroad to Uruguayan side Miramar Misiones in summer 2005. He returned to Costa Rica to play for Carmelita and Brujas again.
In 2007, Woodly moved to El Salvador, to play for Alianza only to return to Brujas and then San Carlos. He then signed for Chinese outfit Chongqing Lifan in March 2009.

He transferred to Dalian Aerbin in January 2011. Dalian successfully achieved League One champions for the first time in the 2011 league season. He finished the season with the League One top scorer, scored 13 goals, which shared with Mitchel Brown.

He transferred to another Chinese second-tier club, Fujian Smart Hero, in US$150,000 in February 2011. Scoring 21 goals in 28 appearances in the 2012 season, he extended his contract with the club and followed the club to move to Shijiazhuang in 2013, making him the longest serving Tico in China.

In February 2014, Woodly transferred to China League One side Xinjiang Tianshan Leopard.

At the end of August 2019, Woodly left La U Universitarios and joined C.D. Barrio México.

International career
Woodly was called up to Costa Rica's Copa America Centenario squad to replace the injured Ariel Rodríguez.

Chinese League career statistics 
(Correct as of 2013)

Honours

Clubs

Dalian Aerbin
 China League One: 2011

Individual
 China League One top scorer: 2011

References

External links
 Profile at Sohu Sports
  
 

1980 births
Living people
Footballers from San José, Costa Rica
Association football forwards
Costa Rican footballers
Chinese Super League players
China League One players
Liga FPD players
A.D. Carmelita footballers
Brujas FC players
Miramar Misiones players
Alianza F.C. footballers
A.D. San Carlos footballers
Chongqing Liangjiang Athletic F.C. players
Changchun Yatai F.C. players
Dalian Professional F.C. players
Cangzhou Mighty Lions F.C. players
Xinjiang Tianshan Leopard F.C. players
C.S.D. Municipal players
Municipal Grecia players
L.D. Alajuelense footballers
C.S. Cartaginés players
Costa Rican expatriate footballers
Expatriate footballers in Uruguay
Expatriate footballers in El Salvador
Expatriate footballers in China
Expatriate footballers in Guatemala
Costa Rican expatriate sportspeople in China
Costa Rican expatriate sportspeople in Guatemala
Copa América Centenario players